Vassilis Xanthopoulos (alternate spellings: Vasilios, Vasilis, Vasileios; Greek: Βασίλης Ξανθόπουλος; born 29 April 1984) is a Greek professional basketball player for AEK Athens of the Greek Basket League and the Basketball Champions League. He is 6 ft 2 in (1.88 m) tall and he plays at the point guard position.

Professional career
Xanthopoulos grew up playing for the Olympiacos Piraeus junior teams, starting to play with them in 1997. After playing with Peiraikos Syndesmos in the amateur level Greek B League (Greek 3rd Division) in the 2001–02 season,  he began his professional career in 2002, with Near East, in the Greek Basket League. Xanthopoulos transferred from Near East to Panathinaikos in 2004.

In 2005, he loaned to PAOK Thessaloniki. In 2006, he returned to Panathinaikos and with them he won the Triple Crown championship in 2007.  His team accomplished this by winning the Greek League championship, Greek Cup, and the EuroLeague all in the same season. With Panathinaikos, Xanthopoulos won 2 Greek League championships and 2 Greek Cups.

In 2007, he transferred to Panionios. In 2009, he moved to Panellinios. In 2012, he returned to Panathinaikos. He moved to the Spanish League club Obradoiro in 2013. He returned to Panionios in 2014.

In 2015, he moved to Aris Thessaloniki.

On July 5, 2017, Xanthopoulos moved to AEK Athens of the Greek League, where he signed a one-year contract with a prospect of renewal for another year. With AEK, he won the Greek Cup title, in 2018 and also the Champions League title the same year. 

On July 1, 2019, Xanthopoulos and AEK officially parted ways. Three days later, Xanthopoulos joined Peristeri. He averaged 2.6 points, 1.6 rebounds, and 3.5 assists per game with Peristeri. On August 13, 2020, Xanthopoulos parted ways with the team.

On August 21, 2020, Xanthopoulos moved to Kolossos Rodou. On June 30, 2021, he renewed his contract with the island team and was named team captain. In 17 games, he averaged 4.2 points (shooting with 36% from the 3-point line), 2.4 rebounds, 4.9 assists and 1 steal, playing around 20 minutes per contest. He was ruled out just before the end of the season due to an unspecified injury.

On August 29, 2022, Xanthopoulos returned to AEK for a second stint, following his Kolossos coach Ilias Kantzouris.

National team career
Xanthopoulos was also a member of the Greek junior national teams. He won the bronze medal at the 2002 FIBA Europe Under-18 Championship, the bronze medal at the 2003 FIBA Under-19 World Cup, and the silver medal at the 2005 FIBA Under-21 World Cup. He also played at the 2004 FIBA Europe Under-20 Championship.

He has also been a member of the senior men's Greek national basketball team. With Greece's senior national team, he played at EuroBasket 2011.

Career statistics

Domestic Leagues

Regular season

|-
| 2011–12
| style="text-align:left;"| Panionios
| align=center | GBL
| 24  || 25.5 || .413 || .370 || .412 || 1.7 || 4.0 || 1.4 || 0 || 6.6
|-
| 2012–13
| style="text-align:left;"| Panathinaikos
| align=center | GBL
| 24  || 14.1 || .457 || .483 || .692 || 1.7 || 3.0 || 1.0 || 0 || 3.6
|-
| 2013–14
| style="text-align:left;"| Obradoiro
| align=center | ACB
| 34  || 17.3 || .296 || .278 || .618 || 1.8 || 3.1 || 1.0 || 0 || 2.8
|-
| 2014–15
| style="text-align:left;"| Panionios
| align=center | GBL
| 24  || 27.0 || .398 || .339 || .813 || 2.5 || 5.4 || 1.6 || .1 || 6.8
|-
| 2015–16
| style="text-align:left;"| Aris
| align=center | GBL
| 25  || 16.4 || .361 || .265 || .500 || 1.6 || 3.2 || 1.6 || .1 || 2.7
|-
| 2016–17
| style="text-align:left;"| Aris
| align=center | GBL
| 26  || 21.2 || .347 || .328 || .710 || 2.6 || 2.7 || 1.7 || 0 || 4.2
|-
| 2017–18
| style="text-align:left;"| A.E.K.
| align=center | GBL
| 26  || 17.4 || .300 || .229 || .750 || 1.5 || 2.8 || 1.1 || 0 || 2.5
|-
| 2018–19
| style="text-align:left;"| A.E.K.
| align=center | GBL
| 13  || 16.2 || .361 || .350 || .500 || 1.9 || 2.6 || .5 || .1 || 2.6
|}

FIBA Champions League

|-
| style="text-align:left;" | 2016–17
| style="text-align:left;" | Aris
| 18 || 19.6 || .571 || .429 || .714 || 2.2 || 3.5 || 1.4 || .0 || 3.3
|-
| style="text-align:left;background:#AFE6BA;" | 2017–18†
| style="text-align:left;" | A.E.K.
| 20 || 17.3 || .529 || .400 || .917 || 1.4 || 2.8 || 1.2 || .0 || 2.7
|-
| style="text-align:left;" | 2018–19
| style="text-align:left;" | A.E.K.
| 8 || 16.3 || .375 || .200 || - || 1.0 || 3.0 || 1.1 || 0 || .9
|}

References

External links
 Euroleague.net Profile
 FIBA Europe Profile
 Eurobasket.com Profile
 Greek Basket League Profile 
 Hellenic Basketball Federation Profile 
 Spanish League Profile 

1984 births
Living people
AEK B.C. players
Aris B.C. players
Greek men's basketball players
Greek expatriate basketball people in Spain
Kolossos Rodou B.C. players
Liga ACB players
Near East B.C. players
Obradoiro CAB players
Olympiacos B.C. players
Panathinaikos B.C. players
Panellinios B.C. players
Panionios B.C. players
P.A.O.K. BC players
Peiraikos Syndesmos B.C. players
Peristeri B.C. players
Basketball players from Athens
Point guards